Stanley R. Broadbridge (1928 – 22 November 1978) was a British trade unionist, author, and political activist.

Born in Barnet, Middlesex, Broadbridge joined the Communist Party of Great Britain (CPGB) in the late 1940s, and argued that the party should call for a vote for the Labour Party where it did not stand its own candidate, in opposition to Pat Sloan's view.

Broadbridge became a lecturer in economics at North Staffordshire Polytechnic, and joined the Association of Teachers in Technical Institutions (ATTI), serving as its president in 1972.  He became the treasurer of the north west region of the Campaign for Nuclear Disarmament, the president of the Staffordshire County Association of Trades Councils, serving from 1974 until 1976, and also vice chair of the West Midlands Regional Council of the Trades Union Congress.

In the 1960s, Broadbridge wrote several articles for Labour Monthly, and a CPGB pamphlet, The Lancashire Cotton 'famine' (1861-65).  In his spare time, he enjoyed canal boating, and in 1974 he wrote The Birmingham canal navigations: Vol.1, 1768-1846.

The ATTI became part of the new National Association of Teachers in Further and Higher Education in 1976, and Broadbridge was elected as its general secretary the following year.  However, Broadbridge was diagnosed with cancer, and died in 1978.

References

1928 births
1978 deaths
Academics of Staffordshire University
English trade unionists
English writers
British trade union leaders
People from the London Borough of Barnet